The Schule für Gestaltung Basel (Basel School of Design), located at the Allgemeine Gewerbeschule in Basel Switzerland, and its students have influenced the international graphic design community since it opened in 1968. Its tradition is shaped by graphic design pioneers Armin Hofmann, Emil Ruder, and Wolfgang Weingart. The name of the school represents an educational approach which perpetuates their ideas: to lay a strong and broad foundation for the major design disciplines.

The Weiterbildungsklasse für Grafik (Advanced Class for Graphic Design) ran from 1968–1999 to address the growing interest of many trained designers who were searching for a means to deepen or extend their knowledge or skills, this international postgraduate program for graphic design was conceived. The program offered an intensive study of basic design principles and a broad horizon in form-related design processes. For thirty years, students from all over the world attended the program and it became an outstanding model for a modernist design education.

In 1999, part of the Schule für Gestaltung Basel was assimilated by the University of Applied Sciences and Arts Northwestern Switzerland (FHNW). Continuing the tradition set forth by the Weiterbildunglsklasse für Grafik, a collaboration initiated in 2007 by the School of Design at University of Illinois Chicago (UIC) and the Academy of Art and Design FHNW offers a two-year internationally accredited Master of Design degree, providing graphic designers with a bachelor’s degree and professional design experience the opportunity to hone their skills and further develop their approach to visual communication.

The Schule für Gestaltung Basel’s Basics in Design program offers its own professional courses of study, as well as postgraduate programs in textile design, typography, and graphic design. In addition, a month-long Summer Workshops has been offered since 2005, based on the Yale-Brissago Summer Program (1977–1996).

External links 
 Schule für Gestaltung Basel
 Basics in Design
 Basel Summer Workshops
 MDes Basel
 MDes at UIC School of Design

Organisations based in Basel
Educational institutions established in 1968
1968 establishments in Switzerland